An automotive museum is a museum that explores the history of automotive-related transportation.

 Bold – Automotive museums owned by automotive manufacturers
 Italics – no longer open to public access, excludes private or invitation only collections that was never intended for public access


Asia

Eastern Asia

China

 , Beijing
 Beijing Auto Museum, Beijing
 Grand Prix Museum, Macau
 Shanghai Auto Museum, Shanghai

Japan

  (Hino Motors), Hachiōji, Tokyo
 Historic Car Gallery, Dachi, Toki, Gifu
 Honda Collection Hall (Honda), Motegi, Tochigi
  (Daihatsu), Ikeda, Osaka
 , Kiryū, Gunma
 Matsuda Collection
  (Mazda), Hiroshima, Hiroshima
 Mitsubishi Auto Gallery (Mitsubishi Motors), Okazaki, Aichi
 , Komatsu, Ishikawa
 , Tsuruoka, Yamagata
 Nissan Engine Museum (Nissan), Yokohama, Kanagawa
 Nissan Heritage Collection (Nissan), Zama, Kanagawa
 , Okaya, Nagano
 , Kōnan, Kōchi
  (Suzuki), Hamamatsu, Shizuoka
 Toyota Automobile Museum (Toyota), Nagakute, Aichi
 Toyota Commemorative Museum of Industry and Technology (Toyota), Nagoya, Aichi
  (Toyota), Toyota, Aichi
  (Yamaha Motor Company), Iwata, Shizuoka
 , Kazo, Saitama

South Korea
 Renault Samsung Motors Gallery (Renault Samsung Motors)
 Hyundai Kia R&D Museum (Hyundai Motor Group)
 Samsung Transportation Museum (Samsung Fire&Marine Insurance Co. LTD)
 Hyundai Motorstudio Seoul (Hyundai Motor Group)
 World Automobile & Piano Museum, Jeju Province

Taiwan
 Taxi Museum, Su'ao, Yilan County

Southeastern Asia

Indonesia
 Museum Angkut, Batu, East Java

Southern Asia

India
 Sudha Cars Museum, Hyderabad
 Dastan Auto World Vintage Car Museum, Ahmedabad, India
 Heritage Motor Museum, Gurgaon, India
 GeeDee Car Museum, Coimbatore, Tamil Nadu

Western Asia

Cyprus
 Cyprus Historic and Classic Motor Museum

Georgia
 Tbilisi Auto Museum

Iran
 National Car Museum of Iran

Israel
 Tefen Car Collection, Tefen
 Ralex Automobile museum, Ashdod

Kuwait
 Historical, Vintage, and Classical Cars Museum

Turkey
 Key Classic Car Museum, Torbalı, Izmir,
 Rahmi M. Koç Museum, Hasköy, Istanbul,
 Sabri Artam Classic Car Museum, Çengelköy, Istanbul,
 Tofaş Museum of Cars and Anatolian Carriages, Bursa,
 Ural Ataman Classic Car Museum, Tarabya, Istanbul,

United Arab Emirates
 Al Ain Classic Car Museum
 Emirates National Auto Museum

Europe

Eastern Europe

Czech Republic

 Škoda Auto Museum (Škoda Auto)
 Sports car museum, Lany.
 , Kopřivnice
 Veteran arena, Olomouc.

Poland
 Muzeum Inżynierii Miejskiej w Krakowie

Russia
 Autoville, Moscow
 , (Lada), Tolyatti
 First Private Museum of Retro and Military Vehicles, Moscow
 , Moscow
 
 Retro auto museum, Moscow
 Retro cars museum, Vyborg
 Retro cars museum, Zelenogorsk
 Retro cars museum, Yekaterinburg
 UMMC Museum of Military and Automotive Equipment, Verkhnyaya Pyshma
 , Arkhangelskoe
 Vintage cars museum, Saint Petersburg

Ukraine
 AvtoZAZ Museum (ZAZ), Zaporizhzhia
 , Zaporizhzhia
 Portal, Zaporizhzhia

Northern Europe

Denmark

 , Aakirkeby
 , Odense
 , Gjern
 , Næstved
 , Torup
 , Glamsbjerg
 , Nærum
 Veteranmuseet at Egeskov Castle
 Veteranmuseet at AalholmEstonia
 Car Museum, Halinga

Finland
 
 
 Mobilia, Kangasala
 
 
 

Latvia
 Riga Motor Museum

Sweden

 
 
 Car Museum - Albinsson & Sjöberg, Karlskrona
 Göran Karlsson's Motor Museum
 
 
 Marcus Wallenberg-hallen (Scania)
 Motala Motor Museum
 
 Saab Car Museum (Saab)
 
 Volvo Museum (Volvo)
 

Southern Europe

Bulgaria
 Retro-Museum, Varna shopping centre

Croatia
 Ferdinand Budicki Automobile Museum

Greece
 Hellenic Motor Museum, Athens, Attica

Italy

 Museo Casa Enzo Ferrari (Ferrari)
  (Fiat)
 Museo Ferrari (Ferrari)
 Museo Ferruccio Lamborghini (Lamborghini)
 Museo Lamborghini (Lamborghini)
  (Lancia)
 Museo Nazionale dell'Automobile
 
 Museo Mille Miglia
 Museo Storico Alfa Romeo (Alfa Romeo)
 Museo Targa Florio
 

Romania
 , Bucharest

 Serbia 
 , Belgrade

Western Europe

Andorra
 National Automobile Museum

Austria
 Rolls-Royce Museum
 Automobilmuseum Aspang

Belgium

 AutoWorld
 Mahymobiles

France

 Cité de l'automobile - Musée national - Collection Schlumpf
 Renault Classic (Renault)
 Musée de l'Aventure Peugeot (Peugeot)
  (Citroën)
 Musée des 24 Heures du Mans
 Musée national de la Voiture et du Tourisme - Château de Compiègne
 Musée automobile Reims Champagne
 Musée de la Chartreuse, Molsheim

Germany

 August Horch Museum Zwickau (Audi)
 Automobile Welt Eisenach
 Automuseum Dr. Carl Benz
 Autosammlung Steim
 Autostadt (Volkswagen Group)
 BMW Museum (BMW)
 Mercedes-Benz Museum (Daimler AG)
 
 Museum Autovision
 
 Museum for Historical Maybach Vehicles
 museum mobile (Audi)
 Porsche Museum (Porsche)
 Sinsheim Auto & Technik Museum
 Technikmuseum Speyer
 Prototyp - Personen.Kraft.Wagen in Hamburg
 PS Speicher
 

Malta
 Malta Classic Car Museum

Monaco
 Monaco Top Cars Collection, Fontvieille, Monaco

Netherlands

 Louwman Museum

Portugal
 , Caramulo

 San Marino 
  (Ferrari and Abarth)

 Spain 
 
 
 Museo de Coches Clásicos y Antiguos Torre Loizaga (Galdames)

Switzerland
 Autobau Erlebniswelt, Romanshorn
 Fondation Pierre Gianadda, Martigny
 Swiss Transport Museum

United Kingdom

England

 Bentley Wildfowl and Motor Museum
 British Commercial Vehicle Museum
 British Motor Museum
 Brooklands Museum
 Bubble Car Museum, Langrick, Boston, England
 Cars of the Stars Motor Museum
 Cotswold Motoring Museum
 Coventry Transport Museum
 Donington Grand Prix Exhibition
 Great British Car Journey
 Haynes International Motor Museum
 Ipswich Transport Museum
 Lakeland Motor Museum
 London Motor Museum
 Mercedes-Benz World (Daimler AG)
 National Motor Museum, Beaulieu
 Oxford Bus Museum

Scotland
 Myreton Motor Museum
 Riverside Museum

Wales
 Llangollen Motor Museum
 Pembrokeshire Motor Museum

North America

Canada
 Canadian Automotive Museum
 Manitoba Antique Automobile Museum
 Reynolds-Alberta Museum

Cayman Islands
 Cayman Motor Museum

United States

Eastern United States
 AACA Museum, Hershey, Pennsylvania
 America On Wheels, Allentown, Pennsylvania
 Audrain Automobile Museum, Newport, Rhode Island
 BMW CCA Foundation Museum, Greer, South Carolina
 BMW Zentrum, Greer, South Carolina
 Buffalo Transportation Pierce-Arrow Museum, Buffalo, New York
 Champlain Valley Transportation Museum, Plattsburgh, New York
 Cole Land Transportation Museum, Bangor, Maine
 Don Garlits Museum of Drag Racing, Ocala, Florida
 Fort Lauderdale Antique Car Museum, Fort Lauderdale, Florida 
 Frick Car & Carriage Museum, Pittsburgh, Pennsylvania
 JWR Automobile Museum, Frackville, Pennsylvania
 Larz Anderson Auto Museum, Brookline, Massachusetts
 Memory Lane Motorsports & Historic Auto Museum, Mooresville, North Carolina
 Miami Auto Museum at the Dezer Collection, North Miami, Florida
 Miles Through Time Automotive Museum, Toccoa, Georgia
 Muscle Car City, Punta Gorda, Florida
 Newport Car Museum, Portsmouth, Rhode Island
 Northeast Classic Car Museum, Norwich, New York
 Northeast Motorsports Museum, Loudon, New Hampshire
 Old Spokes Auto Museum, New Smithville, Pennsylvania
 Owls Head Transportation Museum, Owls Head, Maine
 Revs Institute, Naples, Florida
 Saratoga Automobile Museum, Saratoga Springs, New York
 Savoy Automobile Museum, Cartersville, Georgia
 Seal Cove Auto Museum, Seal Cove, Maine
 Simeone Foundation Automotive Museum, Philadelphia, Pennsylvania
 Tallahassee Automotive Museum, Tallahassee, Florida
 Tampa Bay Automobile Museum, Pinellas Park, Florida
 The William E. Swigart, Jr. Antique Automobile Museum, Huntingdon, Pennsylvania

Central United States
 America's Packard Museum, Dayton, Ohio
 Antique Car Museum of Iowa, Coralville, Iowa
 Auburn Cord Duesenberg Automobile Museum, Auburn, Indiana
 Barber Vintage Motorsports Museum, Birmingham, Alabama
 Beller Museum, Romeoville, Illinois
 British Transportation Museum, Dayton, Ohio
 Canton Classic Car Museum, Canton, Ohio
 City Garage Car Museum, Greeneville, Tennessee
 Classic Car Collection, Kearney, Nebraska
 Crawford Auto-Aviation Museum, Cleveland, Ohio
 Dick's Classic Garage Car Museum, San Marcos, Texas (closed)
 Dream Car Museum, Evansville, Indiana
 Edge Motor Museum, Memphis, Tennessee
 Ford Piquette Avenue Plant, Detroit, Michigan
 Four States Auto Museum, Texarkana, Arkansas
 Gilmore Car Museum, Hickory Corners, Michigan
 GM Heritage Center, Sterling Heights, Michigan
 Hemken Collection, Williams, Iowa
 Henry Ford Museum (Ford Motor Company), Dearborn, Michigan
 Hostetler's Hudson Auto Museum, Shipshewana, Indiana Closed 2018
 Indianapolis Motor Speedway Museum, Speedway, Indiana
 Kansas City Automotive Museum, Olathe, Kansas
 Kokomo Automotive Museum, Kokomo, Indiana
 Lane Motor Museum, Nashville, Tennessee
 Midwest Dream Car Collection, Manhattan, Kansas
 National Auto and Truck Museum, Auburn, Indiana
 National Corvette Museum, Bowling Green, Kentucky
 National Packard Museum, Warren, Ohio
 Pioneer Village, Minden, Nebraska
 Pontiac-Oakland Museum & Resource Center, Pontiac, Illinois
 R. E. Olds Transportation Museum, Lansing, Michigan
 Speedway Motors Museum of American Speed, Lincoln, Nebraska
 Stahls Automotive Collection, Chesterfield, Michigan	
 Studebaker National Museum, South Bend, Indiana
 Tupelo Automobile Museum, Tupelo, Mississippi
 Vehicle Vault Auto Gallery, Parker, Colorado
 Volo Auto Museum, Volo, Illinois
 Walter P. Chrysler Museum (Chrysler Group), Auburn Hills, Michigan
 Wheels O' Time Museum, Peoria, Illinois
 Wills Sainte Claire Auto Museum, Marysville, Michigan
 Wisconsin Automotive Museum, Hartford, Wisconsin
 Ypsilanti Auto Heritage Museum, Ypsilanti, Michigan

Western United States
 Academy of Art University Automobile Museum, San Francisco, California
 America's Car Museum, Tacoma, Washington
 Automobile Driving Museum, El Segundo, California
 Blackhawk Automotive Museum, Danville, California
 California Automobile Museum, Sacramento, California
 Cussler Museum, Arvada, Colorado
 Fountainhead Antique Auto Museum, Fairbanks, Alaska
 The Franklin Auto Museum, Tucson, Arizona
 Gateway Auto Museum, Gateway, Colorado
 J.A. Cooley Museum, San Diego, California
 LeMay Family Collection, Tacoma, Washington
 Marconi Automotive Museum, Tustin, California
 Martin Auto Museum, Phoenix, Arizona
 Mullin Automotive Museum, Oxnard, California
 Murphy Auto Museum, Oxnard, California
 Museum of Automobiles, Morrilton, Arkansas 
 National Automobile Museum, Reno, Nevada
 The Nethercutt Collection, Sylmar, California
 Nostalgia Street Rods, Goldstrom's Automobile Collection, Las Vegas, Nevada
 Penske Racing Museum, Scottsdale, Arizona
 Petersen Automotive Museum, Los Angeles, California
 San Diego Automotive Museum, San Diego, California
 Thunder Dome Car Museum, Enumclaw, Washington
 Toyota USA Automobile Museum''' (Toyota Motor Sales, U.S.A., Inc.), Torrance, California
 Western Antique Aeroplane & Automobile Museum, Hood River, Oregon
 Woodland Auto Display, Paso Robles, California
 World of Speed, Wilsonville, Oregon

 Oceania 

Australia
 Ford Discovery Centre''
 Motor Museum of Western Australia
 National Automobile Museum of Tasmania
 National Motor Museum, Birdwood
 National Military Vehicle Museum
 National Road Transport Hall of Fame
 The Australian Motorlife Museum
 Gosford Classic Car Museum
 Qld Motorsport Museum, Ipswich.

New Zealand
 Bill Richardson Transport World
 Museum of Transport and Technology
 National Transport and Toy Museum
 Nelson Classic Car Collection
 Omaka Classic Cars
 Southward Car Museum
 Warbirds and Wheels
 Yaldhurst Museum

South America

Argentina

 Museo Juan Manuel Fangio

Brazil

 Museu do Automóvel do Ceará
 Museu do Automóvel de Curitiba

Chile

 Auto Museum Moncopulli, Casilla 204, Osorno, Región de los Lagos. 70 Studebakers and 70 other vintage cars.

References

External links
 Automotive Museum Guide
 Museum List – National Association of Automobile Museums

Lists of transport museums
List of automobile museums